Naegleria lovaniensis is a species of Naegleria. It is considered non-pathogenic.

References

Further reading

External links
 Centers for Disease Control and Prevention (CDC) Naegleria Information

Percolozoa
Species described in 1980